Muppet Adventure: Chaos at the Carnival is a video game released for the Apple II, Commodore 64 and MS-DOS in 1989 by Hi Tech Expressions.  It was ported to Nintendo Entertainment System in 1990.  The game features Muppets created by Jim Henson in a series of carnival-inspired mini games searching for enough keys to rescue Miss Piggy from Dr. Grump. These mini games include Bumper Cars, Funhouse, Tunnel of Love, Duck Hunt and Space Ride. The game was initially released for the Apple IIc with a bug which caused it to be unwinnable. Upon achieving the win condition versus Dr. Grump, the game would enter an endless cycle of taking the player back to a previous level, instead of having Dr. Grump be defeated.

NES port
The NES version of the game is unique from its computer counterparts in that it has an on-screen hearts designating hit detection, but eliminates the two-player mode. The player is required to complete each level with a specific character. The initial levels, which you can complete in any order, are as follows;

Kermit the Frog rides an inner tube down a river, Fozzie Bear must escape a Fun House of desserts, Gonzo flies a space ship and Animal drives a bumper car. After completing these initial levels, the player then controls Kermit the Frog, armed with a feather, in Dr. Grump's castle.

External links

1989 video games
North America-exclusive video games
The Muppets video games
DOS games
Apple II games
Commodore 64 games
Hi Tech Expressions games
Nintendo Entertainment System games
Video games about amphibians
Video games about pigs
Video games about bears
Video games developed in the United States